Troy Lee Neel (born September 14, 1965) is an American former professional baseball player. After a solid start in Major League Baseball (MLB), Neel moved to Japan and compiled strong numbers in six seasons playing in Nippon Professional Baseball (NPB). In 2022, Neel came 11,682 out of 669,173 people in the Australian ESPN AFL tipping contest.

Early life
Neel was born in Freeport, Texas. He attended Texas A&M University before his professional baseball career.

Career
He made his debut on May 30th against the Baltimore Orioles, hitting second in the lineup and playing the entire game in left field. He went 0 for 4 with 2 strike outs. His first Major League hit was as a pinch hitter off reliever Bobby Thigpen of the Chicago White Sox on June 5th and his first career home run came on July 6th against Jeff Muttis of the Cleveland Indians. That game was his best of the year, going 3 for 5 with a 2-run home run, a double and 3 runs scored. By the end of the season he saw action in 24 games, hitting for a .264 batting average (14 hits in 53 at bats), with 3 home runs and 9 runs batted in, playing first base, left field and designated hitter. 
In 1993 Neel became a first-string player, belting 19 home runs with 63 RBI's on a solid .290 average. The following year his playing time was a bit reduced to 83 games, yet he still provided punch with 15 HR and 48 RBI's. Unexpectedly that would turn out to be his last year in the majors. He finished with a career .280 average in 758 at bats.

Moving to Japan, he had a successful baseball career for the Orix BlueWave, playing with them for six seasons from  until . 

Neel was the Most Valuable Player in the 1996 Japan Series, as the BlueWave defeated the Yomiuri Giants 4-games-to-1. Neel had 6 RBI in the Series.

Neel finished his professional baseball career in 2001 playing with the Doosan Bears in Korea.

Personal life
Neel has been married at least two times.

Child support controversy
In 2000, Neel was ordered by the State of Texas to pay $5,000 a month in child support to his ex-wife who is the mother of his two children, a son and daughter. Instead of paying, Neel fled the country and played baseball in Japan.

After retiring from athletics, the remarried Neel purchased a 16-acre  island in Vanuatu in the South Pacific, where he and his wife ran a 21-room resort which cost a reported $1.5 million overlooking a lagoon Called "the worst dead beat dad in 'the history of Texas'", he owed over $725,000 in child support, ultimately determined to be $778,000. In 2005, a grand jury in San Antonio indicted Neel on a charge of foreign travel to evade child support obligations.

His passport expired in 2008, and Vanuatu authorities forced him to leave the country. On December 11, 2008, Neel was arrested at the Los Angeles International Airport by US Health and Human Services investigators after he exited a plane from Sydney, Australia; he awaited trial in San Antonio, Texas. On May 7, 2009 Neel was scheduled to plead guilty in court to avoiding child support payments. Neel faced as much as two years in federal prison and a $250,000 fine.

Neel reached a one-lump settlement with his ex-wife, for $116,000 and not the $778,000 he owed, a reduction of 85%. He received no jail time sentence, only probation.

References

External links

Career statistics and player information from Korea Baseball Organization

1965 births
Living people
American expatriate baseball players in Canada
American expatriate baseball players in Japan
American expatriate baseball players in South Korea
Baseball players from Texas
Batavia Trojans players
Burlington Indians players (1986–2006)
Canton-Akron Indians players
Colorado Springs Sky Sox players
Doosan Bears players
Howard Hawks baseball players
Huntsville Stars players
KBO League infielders
Major League Baseball first basemen
Mayos de Navojoa players
American expatriate baseball players in Mexico
Nippon Professional Baseball designated hitters
Nippon Professional Baseball infielders
Oakland Athletics players
Orix BlueWave players
People from Freeport, Texas
Tacoma Tigers players
Texas A&M Aggies baseball players
Vancouver Canadians players
Waterloo Indians players
Texas A&M Aggies football players
American expatriates in Vanuatu
American sportspeople convicted of crimes